The Samsung SPH-M910 (marketed as the Samsung Intercept) is a discontinued Android smartphone manufactured by Samsung. It was released on July 11, 2010, for Sprint in the United States, and was also released on Sprint Nextel-owned prepaid cell phone company Virgin Mobile on October 4, 2010.

It was marketed as an updated version of the very similar Samsung Moment, though in several respects its features are inferior: its screen resolution of 240×400 is less than the 320×480 resolution of the Moment, it does not have a camera flash, and the Sprint version (but not the Virgin Mobile version) of the Intercept supports only EVDO Rev. 0 rather than the faster Rev. A standard supported by the Moment.  Unlike the Moment, its touch screen does support multi-touch.

Android enthusiasts created unofficial ports of Android 2.3 Gingerbread and Android 4.0 Ice Cream Sandwich to run on the SPH-M910.

A Micro-USB port is provided for charging the battery and data connectivity.

References

External links

Samsung Intercept (phonescoop.com)
Official Samsung Specifications
ifixit.com M910 teardown
eBay parts

Intercept
Android (operating system) devices
Mobile phones introduced in 2010
Mobile phones with an integrated hardware keyboard
Sprint Corporation